Ajji is an Indian Hindi-language crime-drama film directed by Devashish Makhija. The film stars Sushama Deshpande, Sharvani Suryavanshi, Abhishek Banerjee, Sadiya Siddiqui, Vikas Kumar, Manuj Sharma, Sudhir Pandey, Kiran Khoje, and Smita Tambe in major roles. "Ajji" has been positioned as a dark take on the classic fairy tale, "Red Riding Hood". The film is backed by Yoodlee Films, a production venture of Saregama.The film won the Fresh Blood competition at the Beaune International Thriller Film Festival, France 2018. Sushama Deshpande, who played ‘Ajji’ won The Flame Award at the UK Asian Film Festival and received a special jury mention for her performance in the film at the Indian Film Festival of Los Angeles (IFFLA). Ajji was officially invited to compete at the 2017 Busan International Film Festival (BIFF) and was showcased in the New Currents section of the 22nd Korean film extravaganza. Ajji was also a part of the Mumbai Film Festival (MAMI) which took place 12–18 October and was played as a part of the India Gold category. Other official selection for festivals include Dharamshala International Film Festival, Singapore International Film Festival and Tallinn Black Nights Film Festival. The film was nominated for the Netpac Award at the 2018 Rotterdam International Film Festival. The film was released on 24 November 2017. Ajji is now available on Netflix.

Synopsis 
When Ajji's 10-year-old granddaughter is raped, she finds that the police are unable to arrest the culprit as he is a local politician's son. Ajji decides to take matters into her own hands.

Cast
 Sushama Deshpande as Ajji 
 Smita Tambe as Vibha
 Sharvani Suryavanshi as Manda 
 Sadiya Siddiqui as Leela 
 Trimala Adhikari as Dolly 
 Rasika Agashe as Ayurved
 Sudhir Pandey as Sharafat
 Shrikant Yadav as Dhavle Senior
 Abhishek Banerjee as Dhavle Junior
 Vikas Kumar as Inspector
 Manuj Sharma as Umya 
 Shreyas Pandit as Milind
 Kaamod L. Kharade as Gawli 
 Kiran Khoje as Dhavle Junior's wife 
 Afreen Shaikh as Mukta

Development 
Jishnu Bhattacharjee is the cinematographer of the film. The film has been edited by Ujjwal Chandra, while the casting credits go to Abhishek Banerjee and Anmol Ahuja. Sikander Ahmad, Shamim Khan and Tiya Tejpal are the production designers of the film.

Soundtrack 
The music of the film has been given by Mangesh Dhakde with Kaamod Kharade working as sound designer and Aditya Yadav as sound editor.

Critical reception 
The film majorly received positive reviews from critics.

The Hollywood Reporter termed it as one of India's strongest independents this year. Renuka Vyavahare of The Times of India rated the film 4 out of 5 stars. Kunal Guha of Mumbai Mirror also rated it 4 stars out of 5, saying "Devashish Makhija's film manages to keep one on the edge." Subhash K. Jha said that "cinema cannot get any more basic or honest than this" and gave the movie 4 out of 5 stars. Movie Talkies gave the film 4/5 stars and wrote that "the cinematographer deserves a pat on the back for highlighting the dark and dingy underbelly of Mumbai."

Deccan Chronicle gave the movie 3.5 out of 5 stars calling it a standout film with a medieval, moral soul. Giving Ajji 3 stars out of 5, Anupama Chopra said that "Devashish is a master of atmosphere. He skillfully sets up a deep dread." Movie critic Rajeev Masand said, "It took me a long time to get the film out of my head" and gave it 3/5 stars. Daily News and Analysis gave the movie 3.5 out of 5 stars stating that "Ajji is not for the faint hearted." Glamsham called it a "bloody gruesome 'cut' above indie and rated the film 3.5 out of 5 stars. Rohit Vats of Hindustan Times gave the film 3 out of 5 stars calling it "An unpretentious revenge saga served with proper dose of blood and gore"

Filmfare rated the movie 2.5 out of 5 stars and called it "a film strictly for fans of dark and delicious cinema." Trade analyst Komal Nahta said that "Ajji is too dark and depressing to make a mark at the box office".

Other Reviews :

"Ajji is like no other revenge drama" - Arré

"Ajji makes for bold and gritty viewing, but it is essential" - Cinestaan

"Must watch Indie film of the year" - Screen Anarchy

"Ajji, in a way, is a flesh-and-blood product of 'realism' films" - Film Companion

"Direct & Effective" - Screen International

References

External References 
  news18.com
  outlookindia.com
 asianage.com
 outlookindia.com/newsscroll

External links 
 
 
 Ajji at Saregama

Films about rape in India
2010s Hindi-language films
Indian rape and revenge films
Indian drama films
Hindi-language drama films
2017 drama films